The true finches are small to medium-sized passerine birds in the family Fringillidae. Finches have stout conical bills adapted for eating seeds and nuts and often have colourful plumage. They occupy a great range of habitats where they are usually resident and do not migrate. They have a worldwide distribution except for Australia and the polar regions. The family Fringillidae contains more than two hundred species divided into fifty genera. It includes species known as siskins, canaries, redpolls, serins, grosbeaks and euphonias.

Many birds in other families are also commonly called "finches". These groups include the estrildid finches (Estrildidae) of the Old World tropics and Australia; some members of the Old World bunting family (Emberizidae) and the New World sparrow family (Passerellidae); and the Darwin's finches of the Galapagos islands, now considered members of the tanager family (Thraupidae).

Finches and canaries were used in the UK, US and Canada in the coal mining industry to detect carbon monoxide from the eighteenth to twentieth century. This practice ceased in the UK in 1986.

Systematics and taxonomy
The taxonomy of the finch family, in particular the cardueline finches, has a long and complicated history. The study of the relationship between the taxa has been confounded by the recurrence of similar morphologies due to the convergence of species occupying similar niches. In 1968 the American ornithologist Raymond Andrew Paynter, Jr. wrote:
Limits of the genera and relationships among the species are less understood – and subject to more controversy – in the carduelines than in any other species of passerines, with the possible exception of the estrildines [waxbills].
Beginning around 1990 a series of phylogenetic studies based on mitochondrial and nuclear DNA sequences resulted in substantial revisions in the taxonomy. Several groups of birds that had previously been assigned to other families were found to be related to the finches. The Neotropical Euphonia and the Chlorophonia were formerly placed in the tanager family Thraupidae due to their similar appearance but analysis of mitochondrial DNA sequences revealed that both genera were more closely related to the finches. They are now placed in a separate subfamily Euphoniinae within the Fringillidae. The Hawaiian honeycreepers were at one time placed in their own family, Drepanididae but were found to be closely related to the Carpodacus rosefinches and are now placed within the Carduelinae subfamily. The three largest genera, Carpodacus, Carduelis and Serinus were found to be polyphyletic. Each was split into monophyletic genera. The American rosefinches were moved from Carpodacus to Haemorhous. Carduelis was split by moving the greenfinches to Chloris and a large clade into Spinus leaving just three species in the original genus. Thirty seven species were moved from Serinus to Crithagra leaving eight species in the original genus. Today the family Fringillidae is divided into three subfamilies, the Fringillinae containing a single genus with the chaffinches, the Carduelinae containing 183 species divided into 49 genera, and the Euphoniinae containing the Euphonia and the Chlorophonia.

Although Przewalski's "rosefinch" (Urocynchramus pylzowi) has ten primary flight feathers rather than the nine primaries of other finches, it was sometimes classified in the Carduelinae. It is now assigned to a distinct family, Urocynchramidae, monotypic as to genus and species, and with no particularly close relatives among the Passeroidea.

Fossil record
Fossil remains of true finches are rare, and those that are known can mostly be assigned to extant genera at least. Like the other Passeroidea families, the true finches seem to be of roughly Middle Miocene origin, around 20 to 10 million years ago (Ma). An unidentifable finch fossil from the Messinian age, around 12 to 7.3 million years ago (Ma) during the Late Miocene subepoch, has been found at Polgárdi in Hungary.

Etymology
The scientific name Fringillidae comes from the Latin word fringilla for the common chaffinch (Fringilla coelebs), a member of the family which is common in Europe. The name was coined (as Fringilladæ) by the English zoologist William Elford Leach in a guide to the contents of the British Museum published in 1820. The study of this family is known as Fringillology.

Description
They typically have strong, stubby beaks, which in some species can be quite large; however, Hawaiian honeycreepers are famous for the wide range of bill shapes and sizes brought about by adaptive radiation. All true finches have 9 primary remiges and 12 rectrices. The basic plumage colour is brownish, sometimes greenish; many have considerable amounts of black, while white plumage is generally absent except as wing-bars or other signalling marks. Bright yellow and red carotenoid pigments are commonplace in this family, and thus blue structural colours are rather rare, as the yellow pigments turn the blue color into green. Many, but by no means all true finches have strong sexual dichromatism, the females typically lacking the bright carotenoid markings of males.

Distribution and habitat

The finches have a near-global distribution, being found across the Americas, Eurasia and Africa, as well as some island groups such as the Hawaiian islands. They are absent from Australasia, Antarctica, the Southern Pacific and the islands of the Indian Ocean, although some European species have been widely introduced in Australia and New Zealand.

Finches are typically inhabitants of well-wooded areas, but some can be found on mountains or even in deserts.

Behaviour
The finches are primarily granivorous, but euphoniines include considerable amounts of arthropods and berries in their diet, and Hawaiian honeycreepers evolved to utilize a wide range of food sources, including nectar. The diet of Fringillidae nestlings includes a varying amount of small arthropods. True finches have a bouncing flight like most small passerines, alternating bouts of flapping with gliding on closed wings. Most sing well and several are commonly seen cagebirds; foremost among these is the domesticated canary (Serinus canaria domestica). The nests are basket-shaped and usually built in trees, more rarely in bushes, between rocks or on similar substrate.

List of genera
The family Fringillidae contains 231 species divided into 50 genera and three subfamilies. The subfamily Carduelinae includes 18 extinct Hawaiian honeycreepers and the extinct Bonin grosbeak. See List of Fringillidae species for further details.

Subfamily Fringillinae
 Fringilla – 3 species of chaffinch and the brambling
Subfamily Carduelinae
 Mycerobas – 4 Palearctic grosbeaks
 Coccothraustes – 3 species
 Eophona – 2 oriental grosbeaks, the Chinese and the Japanese grosbeak
 Pinicola – pine grosbeak
 Pyrrhula – 8 bullfinch species
 Rhodopechys – 2 species, the Asian crimson-winged finch and the African crimson-winged finch
 Bucanetes – trumpeter and the Mongolian finch
 Agraphospiza – Blanford's rosefinch
 Callacanthis – spectacled finch
 Pyrrhoplectes – golden-naped finch
 Procarduelis – dark-breasted rosefinch
 Leucosticte – 6 species of mountain and rosy finches
 Carpodacus – 28 Palearctic rosefinch species
 Hawaiian honeycreeper group (tribe Drepanidini)
Melamprosops – contains a single extinct species, the po'ouli
 Paroreomyza – 3 species, the Oahu alauahio, the Maui alauahio and the extinct kakawahie
 Oreomystis – akikiki
 Telespiza – 4 species, the Laysan finch, the Nihoa finch, and 2 prehistoric species
 Loxioides – 2 species, the palila and a prehistoric species
 Rhodacanthis – 2 recently extinct species, the lesser and the greater koa finch, and 2 prehistoric species
 Chloridops – extinct species, the Kona grosbeak
 Psittirostra – ou
 Dysmorodrepanis – extinct species, the Lanai hookbill
 Drepanis – 2 extinct species, the Hawaii mamo and the black mamo, and the extant iiwi
 Ciridops – single recently extinct species, the Ula-ai-hawane, and 3 prehistoric species
 Palmeria – contains a single species, the akohekohe
 Himatione – 2 species, the apapane and the extinct Laysan honeycreeper
 Viridonia – single extinct species, the greater amakihi
 Akialoa – 4 recently extinct species, and 2 prehistoric species
 Hemignathus – 4 species, only one of which is extant
 Pseudonestor – Maui parrotbill
 Magumma – anianiau
 Loxops – 5 species, of which one is extinct
 Chlorodrepanis – 3 species, the Hawaii, Oahu and Kauai amakihi
 Haemorhous – 3 North America rosefinches
 Chloris – 6 greenfinches
 Rhodospiza – desert finch
 Rhynchostruthus – 3 golden-winged grosbeaks
 Linurgus – oriole finch
 Crithagra – 37 species of canaries, serins and siskins from Africa and the Arabian Peninsula
 Linaria – 4 species including the twite and three linnets
 Acanthis – 3 redpolls
 Loxia – 6 crossbills
 Chrysocorythus – 2 species
 Carduelis – 3 species including the European goldfinch
 Serinus – 8 species including the European serin
 Spinus – 20 species including the North American goldfinches and the Eurasian siskin
Subfamily Euphoniinae
 Euphonia – 27 species all with euphonia in their English name
 Chlorophonia – 5 species all with chlorophonia in their English name

Gallery

See also
The Finch Society of Australia

References

Sources
 Clement, Peter; Harris, Alan & Davis, John (1993): Finches and Sparrows: an identification guide. Christopher Helm, London. 

 Newton, Ian (1973): Finches (New Naturalist series). Taplinger Publishing.

External links

Internet Bird Collection.com: Finch videos, photos, and sounds
National Finch and Softbill Society website — organization promoting finch breeding.

 
 
Miocene birds
Quaternary birds
Extant Miocene first appearances
Taxa named by William Elford Leach